Ophionotus victoriae is a species of brittle star in the order Ophiurida. It has a circumpolar distribution around Antarctica.

Description
Ophionotus victoriae is a large brittle star. It has a wide disc  in diameter and 5 arms that reach  in length. The colour is variable, being white, grey, brown or bluish.

Distribution and habitat
It is sometimes abundant and may represent 60–90% numerically and 40–80% by mass of the total macrofauna of the area.

Biology
Like other Antarctic invertebrates, Ophionotus victoriae has a slow growth rate and can live up to 22 years.
It is a predator and opportunistic generalist and feeds on a wide range of invertebrates, especially krill. It also scavenges, feeds on detritus and even juvenile brittle stars. It is itself preyed on by fish and also by the large brittle star, Ophiosparte gigas, from which it flees. The females spawn in the Antarctic summer and the larvae develop slowly, forming part of the zooplankton before settling on the seabed and becoming juvenile brittle stars.

References

Ophiuridae
Animals described in 1902